The Fujifilm FinePix F series is a line of compact digital cameras that was known for its low-light performance in 2005, with relatively low image noise and natural colors even at high ISO settings. With its relatively large, but moderate resolution Super CCD sensors, it concentrated on image quality, and low-light shooting without flash, which was mostly restricted to prosumer models at the time.

Image comparisons show that Fujifilm's sixth-generation, 6.3-megapixel Super CCD sensor (used on F10/F20/F30/F31 models) set the benchmark for low-noise, high ISO performance among point-and-shoot cameras and has not yet been matched by any of Fuji's higher megapixel Super CCD sensors.

The Fujifilm FinePix F200EXR (February 2009) has low light capabilities similar to the F31fd in pixel binning mode, but allows for double the resolution in good light. However, at the same focal length the lens of the F200EXR is about 1/2 stop slower than that of the F31fd.  The key feature of the F200EXR is its very large dynamic range (estimated to be 11 stops) when used in its dual-capture mode.

Flagship line

F10

The first breakthrough model of the F series, the 6.3-megapixel FinePix F10, was announced in February 2005 and became available on April 30 of that year. The F10 was met with widespread critical acclaim and became a hit seller for Fujifilm. It was the first time that such low noise levels had been seen at ISO 800 and 1600 in a digital compact camera.

In addition to its ISO capability, the F10's success was also fueled by its excellent battery life, speedy shooting, and overall picture quality. One of the camera's weaknesses, however, was manual shooting. Lacking aperture and shutter speed priority modes, the F10 was mostly a point and shoot camera. Other criticisms included the proprietary dongle needed to make any connections to the camera and a relatively high level of purple fringing.

F11
The F10's sibling, the FinePix F11, which was not released in the United States except in the state of Hawaii, added aperture and shutter priority modes but still did not provide full manual control.  It also had a slightly improved LCD screen and a few other minor improvements to the F10.

F30

In May 2006, the F11 was succeeded by the FinePix F30, which added 3200 ISO in full resolution using a 1/1.7" 6th generation Super CCD chip and 2nd generation "RealPhoto technology" including an "intelligent flash". Based on sample images, noise reduction was improved slightly over the F10/F11. Although there is definite noise in pictures taken at 3200 ISO, they are often usable, and the F30 was seen as another leap forward in low-light abilities for a compact camera. As one reviewer stated, 

The F30 also added a new, much higher-resolution LCD screen, improved battery life, an improved menu system, and several new modes including "Natural Light & Flash" in which the camera shoots two pictures in quick succession, one with flash and one without, so the better picture can be chosen later.

F20

In July 2006, Fujifilm announced the FinePix F20, a lower-priced, slightly scaled-down version of the F30 that maintained most of the same features but was geared more towards non-enthusiast users. Compared to the F30, the F20 had a lower-resolution LCD screen, lower capacity battery, a maximum ISO of 2000, and a few other changes to the body and menu system. It also lacked Aperture Priority and Shutter Priority modes. However, considering that the F20 kept all the features that made the F30 great, including the same Super CCD sensor, high-ISO capability, Fujinon lens, and low-noise Real Photo image processor, the F20 was a superb bargain at a street price as low as US$155. A small number of F20s were sold under the names F20SE and F20 LE. The LE version was primarily distributed by a large UK Electronics Retail chain with the only difference being a 'gunmetal' finish.

F31fd

In September 2006, the F30 was succeeded by the FinePix F31fd.

Compared to the F30, the F31fd has a better matrix meter (much less prone to blow highlight detail), a highly useful AUTO ISO 800 mode, and slightly less noise reduction, which preserves more detail in the resulting images compared to the F30.

Moreover, the F31fd features hardware-based Face Detection technology (which debuted with the introduction of the FinePix S6500fd), which allows the camera to automatically focus on and expose for faces. The F31fd also has a new IrSimple data transfer capability for wireless printing and photos viewing on IrSimple enabled TV sets.

As of 2007, the F31fd was considered the best of the low-light compact small sensor cameras.  It also performs remarkably well even against the Sigma DP1, one of very few compact cameras with a Foveon-sized sensor, almost as large in size as the APS-C-sensor in the Fuji X100.

F40fd
In March 2007, Fujifilm released the F40fd, priced at $299. The F40fd is considered to be the successor to the F20, with many new features, most notably a bump to 8.3 megapixel resolution and face detection. The F40fd is noted for its relatively powerful flash; however, it shares the reduced battery capacity and reduced ISO of the F20 (2000 maximum, compared to 3200 on the F30/F31fd). The F40fd introduced support for SD memory cards (in addition to XD-Picture Card; i.e., it supports both). Support for SDHC memory cards was added by the free 1.10 firmware update available from Fujifilm's website . The F40fd was also sold under the name FinePix F45fd with only cosmetic differences.

The Fujifilm FinePixA800 and A805 share the same 8.3 megapixel Super CCD sensor and a similar lens to the F40fd.

F47fd
The FinePix F47fd is identical to the F40fd except its sensor has 9 megapixels. It is not firmware compatible with the F40fd but it has its own firmware update available to add support for SDHC memory cards.

F50fd
On July 26, 2007, FujiFilm announced the latest incarnation in the Finepix 'F' series, the F50fd. Succeeding its 2006 predecessor, the F31fd, this latest model is greatly improved over the F40fd. Boasting a 7th generation 12-megapixel Super CCD, a 2.7 inch amorphous silicon TFT LCD screen and a sleek new design, the F50fd is the first model in the Finepix 'F' series to feature optical-based image stabilization, referred to as Dual Stabilization Mode. Face recognition has been updated to 2.0, now featuring an automatic red-eye removal. No longer does the camera need a direct-frontal shot in order to identify a face, it can capture faces at different angles without the subject having to look straight to the camera. ISO sensitivity has also been extended up to 6400, from 3200 on the F31fd; however, comparisons show that the sensor used in the F30/F31fd/F20 has significantly greater sensitivity. The F50fd is slated for a September 2007 release at an MSRP of $300. A small number of F50fds were sold under the name F50SE.

F100fd
On 24 January 2008, FujiFilm announced F100fd. It features a 12-megapixel chip, a wide angle zoom (28-140mm equiv.), and ISO capabilities up to ISO 3200 (full resolution) or up to ISO 12800 at 3M recorded pixels.  The F100fd does not contain aperture priority or shutter priority modes, hence it cannot be considered a successor of the F11, F30, F31, F50 models. The camera suffers from "pink banding" within high ISO exposure photographs starting at ISO 400. The pink band can be seen on the left side of the photograph. FujiFilm attempted to address the situation with a firmware update. Not all F100's exhibit this problem, and in real world shooting, not artificial 'black space', it is not noticeable in the vast majority of cases.

A drawback of the new wide angle lens in the F100 that the associated aperture has only two positions: wide open and closed.  The F100fd has no continuous aperture. For this reason the F100fd (or a successor with the same lens system) cannot be equipped with the creative shooting modes (i.e. aperture or shutter priority).

In December 2008, the F100fd won the Digital Photography Review "premium compact camera" group test because of its image quality.

F60fd
The Fujifilm FinePix F60fd was announced on 12 August 2008. It is almost identical to the FinePix F50fd except for a larger 3" LCD and updated firmware that includes in-camera relighting (high dynamic range) functions and intelligent scene recognition. In contrast to the F100fd, the F60fd does have photography modes for creative shooting (i.e. aperture and shutter priority).

F200EXR

The Fujifilm FinePix F200EXR was announced on 4 February 2009.  It is the first camera to use the new 12 MP EXR Super CCD sensor.  The camera offers several manual modes and automatic scene recognition.  Its most remarkable feature is the choice between three different sensor modes: full resolution mode, high dynamic range mode, and low light mode. The latter two modes work at effective 6 MP and use two simultaneously taken pictures and pixel binning respectively. The lens of the F200EXR (F/3.3) is slower than that of the F31fd (F/2.8) due to the extended zoom range (5x optical zoom rather than 3x).  The F200EXR also features sensor stabilization.

F70EXR/F72EXR/F75EXR 
Fujifilm announced the FinePix F70EXR on 22 July 2009.  It uses the same Super CCD EXR technology as the F200EXR, only on a smaller 1/2" 10 MP sensor (vs. 1/1.6" 12 MP for the F200EXR).  The smaller sensor is mainly due to the long 10x Fujinon zoom lens (27-270mm, F/3.3-5.6).  The F70EXR has many of the same features of the F200EXR with a few new features including Pro Focus mode, used mainly for portraits and Pro Low Light mode, used in situations that do not have adequate light.  The F72EXR is identical to the F70EXR but has a black body instead of the F70EXR's gunmetal gray color.

F80EXR/F85EXR
Fujifilm announced the FinePix F80EXR on 2 February 2010.  The F80EXR is visually identical to the F70EXR except for some minor differences.  The F80EXR uses a 12-megapixel, 1/2" Super CCD EXR sensor (vs the F70EXR's 10-megapixel sensor). The camera also supports 720P (1280x720) at 30fps video recording along with a slightly larger 3 inch LCD display (vs the F70EXR's 2.7 inch LCD).  New "Pet detection" and an integrated orientation sensor are also included.

F300EXR/F305EXR
Fujifilm announced the FinePix F300EXR in late 2010.  It does not follow the previous F-series camera's large sensor in a small body moto.  The F300EXR now sports a 12MP 1/2" sized SuperCCD EXR sensor, unlike the larger 1/1.6" sensor on the F200EXR which it replaces.  Also new to the F series is a long 15X optical zoom lens (24-360mm) and a hybrid autofocus system which uses both TTL Contrast detection and Phase detection, similar to auto focus systems used in DSLRs.  2 dedicated pixels on the sensor divide incoming light into image pairs to determine the direction and the amount of focus adjustments to achieve faster level of focus compared to TTL contrast auto focus systems.  Other new features include a double sliding lens structure which make the lens both a wide angle and telephoto lens in a smaller package and a pop up flash.  The F300EXR is also capable of 720P high definition video recording.

F500EXR
Fujifilm announced the F500EXR in August 2011. The 16 megapixel camera comes with an EXR CMOS sensor and 15x zoom as well as a 3.0 inch LCD monitor. Other features include full HD movie capture, a Photobook Assist function, face detection & recognition, dog/cat detection, Motion Panorama 360 mode, and Multi Frame Composition.

F550EXR
This 16 megapixel camera features a 1/2" EXR CMOS sensor, 15x zoom, a 3.0 inch LCD screen, 1080p Full-HD recording at 30fps, RAW (RAF format) support and GPS.

F770EXR

Released in March 2012, the F770EXR is standardly black, but also available in red, blue, white, and silver. It features a 20x optical zoom, 3-inch 460,000-dot LCD screen and 1080p Full-HD recording at 30fps, RAW (RAF format) support, 3D still image (MPO compliant) and GPS.

Other models

Prior to the current generation, Fujifilm released a number of cameras with the "F" designation. These included the compact, uniquely shaped F401, F402, F410, F420, F440, and F450, the larger but well-regarded F700 and F810, and the F601 Zoom and F610.  Some of these cameras had earlier versions of the Super CCD sensor, but Fuji had not yet refined the use of the sensor specifically to reduce noise, and had not yet combined other low-light performance features to make them stand out. The F700 and F601 Zoom, for instance, were capable of ISO 1600 but only in 1-megapixel mode. Most of these earlier cameras did not have autofocus assist beams, and none of them had remarkable battery life.

As of July 2006, the current F series lineup also includes two other mid-level compact cameras (the F470 and the F650); although they are positioned above Fuji's entry-level A series cameras, they do not have the Super CCD, manual controls, or many other features of the F20/F30.

As of August 2007, Fujifilm has released a Z series of cameras, including the FinePix Z5fd

Discontinued models
 FinePix F10
 FinePix F11
 Finepix F30
  ...
 FinePix F50fd
 FinePix F60fd
 FinePix F70EXR/F75EXR
 FinePix F100fd
 FinePix F200EXR
 FinePix F480

Comparison of Fujifilm FinePix F-series cameras

See also 
 Fujifilm FinePix
 Fujifilm

Notes

External links

F30 or F31fd reviews 
Arn reviews Fujifilm Finepix F30
Petteri Sulonen reviews the Fuji Finepix F30
F30 Review (dpreview)
F30 Review (dcresource)
Eric Jeschke reviews the Fuji Finepix F31fd
F31fd Review (dpreview)

Reviews of other models 
F100fd Review (DPReview group test)
F100fd Review (Neocamera)
F50fd Review (dpreview)
Fuji Finepix F50 Review (Neocamera)
F10 Review (Neocamera)
DCRP's Fujifilm FinePix F40fd review - May 17, 2007

F series